The Kipawa River (in French: Rivière Kipawa) is a short river in western Quebec, Canada. It is mostly an undeveloped river but the larger lakes have dams, fishing camps, and cottages on their shores. The communities of Kipawa and Laniel are located on Lake Kipawa. Also much logging takes place within its watershed basin, which is consequently crisscrossed by many bush roads. Route 101 crosses the river at Laniel.

The Kipawa River drops  over the last  from Lake Kipawa to its mouth which results in many whitewater rapids, making it popular with kayakers and canoeists. Since 1986, the Kipawa River Rally has been held annually over this stretch of the river.

Its name is derived from the Anishnabe word "Kebaouek" meaning "at the narrows beyond which more water opens out".

Significant lakes
(in downstream order)
Grassy Lake (Lac aux Foins)
Watson Lake
Wolf Lake (Lac des Loups)
Lac Sairs
Grindstone Lake
Hunter Lake
Lake Kipawa

Significant tributaries
Audoin River
Rivière des Lacs

History

The first reference to the river comes from a Catholic priest who in the early 19th century used it to travel upstream to build a mission on Lake Kipawa for Algonquin Native Americans. In 1910, the Laniel Dam at the outflow of Lake Kipawa was built and has a sluice designed to float logs from Lake Kipawa to the Ottawa River.

The first recorded whitewater run on the Kipawa was in 1971 when Jose Mediavilla and Joseph Jacob from Rouyn-Noranda, Quebec, paddled downstream using an open canoe. Mediavilla continued to run it over the years, and by 1976 he was using the river for the practice portion of his whitewater certification courses, sanctioned by the provincial whitewater organization.

The Kipawa River has been the site of the Kipawa River Rally since 1985. The dates have more or less coincided with the St. Jean-Baptiste Holiday in Quebec. It is the second longest running recreational paddling festival in northeastern North America.

In 2007, the Laniel Dam required rebuilding to withstand the 1 in 1000 year flood event. The existing berm was unstable and leaked. But navigation rights through the dam gates were denied from then on. Les Amis de la rivière Kipawa (Friends of the Kipawa River) mounted a Judicial Challenge, arguing that navigation of the sluice is legal, safe, and significant under the Navigable Waters Protection Act. They were overruled by the Federal Court and Federal Appeals Court. Les Amis was subsequently levied with $5,000 in court costs as a result of their challenge thereby putting a damper on other river preservationists hoping to challenge administrative decisions.

The Kipawa River is currently under threat of hydroelectric development by two competing projects which plan to divert the river and would completely alter its natural flow.

The first, proposed by Hydro-Québec, is called TABARET and the other by Innergex on behalf of the Algonquin First Nations based at Wolf Lake. Hydro-Québec has promised hundreds of thousands of dollars per year in 'payments' to the MRC of Temiskaming in exchange for its support of the project.

The TABARET project appears favoured because the OPEMICAN NATIONAL PARK project appears to accommodated the diversion outlet at Lake Temiskaming as envisioned in the project details. The report states: "The potential Parc national d’Opémican will have no influence on the undertaking of either hydroelectric projects currently under study in the county."

Image gallery

See also
List of rivers of Quebec

References

External links 

 Friends of the Kipawa River

Rivers of Abitibi-Témiscamingue